Kandwal is a village and union council of Pind Dadan Khan Tehsil, Jhelum District in Punjab province of Pakistan. The village has a population of about 33,000.

References

Populated places in Tehsil  Pind Dadan Khan
Union councils of Pind Dadan Khan Tehsil